Corus pseudocostiger is a species of beetle in the family Cerambycidae. It was described by Breuning in 1936. It feeds on Acacia plants.

References

pseudocostiger
Beetles described in 1936